The 2017 Mazda Raceway California 8 Hours was the first Mazda Raceway California 8 Hours race held on Mazda Raceway Laguna Seca on 15 October 2017. The race was contested with GT3-spec cars, GT4-spec cars and MARC cars. The race was organized by the Stéphane Ratel Organisation (SRO).

Report

Testing

Free practice

Pre-qualifying practice

Qualifying

Pole shootout

Race

Event format

Race results
Class winners in bold.

See also
2017 Intercontinental GT Challenge
Mazda Raceway Laguna Seca

References

External links

Mazda Raceway California 8 Hours
Mazda Raceway California 8 Hours
2017 in sports in California
Mazda